This is the electoral history of John Hickenlooper, the junior United States senator from Colorado since 2021. He previously served as the 43rd mayor of Denver from 2003 to 2011 and the 42nd governor of Colorado from 2011 to 2019. Hickenlooper briefly sought the 2020 Democratic nomination for President. He ended his presidential campaign in 2019 before voting began and announced his campaign for U.S. Senate days later.

Denver mayoral elections

2003

2007

Colorado gubernatorial elections

2010

2014

U.S. Senate elections

2020

References

John Hickenlooper
Hickenlooper, John
Hickenlooper, John